Ola Gjeilo (born May 5, 1978) is a Norwegian composer and pianist, living in the United States.

He writes choral music, and has written for piano and wind symphony, publishing through Walton Music, Edition Peters, and Boosey and Hawkes.

Biography

Ola Gjeilo was born to Inge and Anne-May Gjeilo, and grew up in Skui, Norway. He began playing piano and composing when he was five years old and learned to read music when he was seven years old. Gjeilo studied classical composition with Wolfgang Plagge. In his undergraduate career, Gjeilo studied at the Norwegian Academy of Music (1999–2001), transferred to the Juilliard School (2001), and studied at the Royal College of Music, London (2002–2004) to receive a bachelor's degree in composition.  He continued his education at Juilliard (2004–06) where he received his master's degree in 2006, also in composition. From 2009 to 2010, Gjeilo was composer-in-residence for Phoenix Chorale.

He currently resides in Manhattan, working as a freelance composer. He is currently composer-in-residence with DCINY and Albany Pro Musica.

Major compositions 
 
Sunrise Mass Orchestrated for strings and choir.   
Dreamweaver Written for choir, piano, and string orchestra. The text is set from a popular medieval ballad from Norway, Draumkvedet, translated into English by Charles Anthony Silvestri, one of his regular collaborators.
The River For choir, piano and string quartet. Composed for the 2016 Brock Commission, awarded from the American Choral Directors Association.

Discography
Note: Piano performed by Ola Gjeilo on all albums.

Choral:
 Winter Songs (Decca Classics, 2017) (with Choir of Royal Holloway and 12 Ensemble)
 Ola Gjeilo (Decca Classics, 2016) (with Voces8, Tenebrae, and the Chamber Orchestra of London)
 Northern Lights (Chandos, 2012) (with the Phoenix Chorale)

Piano:
 Dawn (Decca, 2022)
 Night (Decca, 2020)
 Piano Improvisations (2L, 2012)
 Stone Rose (2L, 2007)

References

External links

 Member of the Norwegian Society of Composers

1978 births
Living people
Concert band composers
Norwegian classical composers
Juilliard School alumni
Norwegian male classical composers
Musicians from Bærum
Norwegian expatriates in the United States
Norwegian male pianists
21st-century pianists
21st-century Norwegian male musicians